Russell Springs may refer to a place in the United States:

 Russell Springs, Kansas
 Russell Springs, Kentucky